Dolac is a village in the municipality of Zavidovići, Bosnia and Herzegovina. It is located in a bend of the River Bosna.

Demographics 
According to the 2013 census, its population was 160.

References

Populated places in Zavidovići